Cecilia Buck-Taylor (born December 18, 1953) is an American politician who served in the Connecticut House of Representatives from the 67th district from 2013 to 2017.

References

1953 births
Living people
Republican Party members of the Connecticut House of Representatives
Women state legislators in Connecticut
Politicians from Brooklyn
21st-century American politicians
21st-century American women politicians